Rebecca Bryant (born 20 December 1963) is an Australian former professional tennis player.

Bryant was raised in Canberra and competed on the professional tour in the 1980s. She reached a career best singles ranking of 149 in the world and twice made the second round of the Australian Open.

ITF finals

Singles (0–2)

Doubles (0–3)

References

External links
 
 

1963 births
Living people
Australian female tennis players
Tennis people from the Australian Capital Territory
20th-century Australian women